VOCs (volatile organic compounds) are a dangerous contaminant of groundwater, leading to groundwater pollution.  They are generally introduced to the environment through careless industrial practices.

Overview
VOCs are responsible for a number of adverse health effects especially for nursing and pregnant mothers.  Many of these compounds were not known to be harmful until the late 1960s and it was some time before regular testing of groundwater identified these substances in drinking water sources.

Specific VOCs

PCE
Tetrachloroethylene is used in metal degreasing and dry cleaning.  It is suspected to cause cancer, and a host of other health problems.

TCE
Trichloroethylene is used in cleaning metal parts and was widely believed to be harmless before being linked to birth defects. It is suspected to cause cancer, and a host of other health problems.

Toluene
Toluene is an organic compound which is mostly harmless to adults and is sometimes abused as an inhalant.  Fetal toluene syndrome has been defined and resembles fetal alcohol syndrome with resultant birth defects, but the U.S. Centers for Disease Control and Prevention have identified differentiating features between the two syndromes including FTS having the additional facial features of micrognathia, large anterior fontanel, down-turned mouth  corners, hair patterning abnormalities, bifrontal narrowing of the face, and ear abnormalities.

History

Camp Lejeune

U.S. Marine Corps Base Camp Lejeune was built near Jacksonville, North Carolina in 1942.  In 1982, the Marine Corps discovered volatile organic compounds (VOCs) in several drinking water wells that fed into two of the eight water systems.  The sources were traced to Tetrachloroethylene (PCE) from a two dry cleaners - one on base, the other off the base and Trichloroethylene which had been used in vehicle maintenance on the base.  These problems were addressed but there were concerns with nursing and pregnant mothers who may have been exposed previously.  It wasn't until the late 1990s that the federal government tried to track down people who may have been exposed.

Love Canal

Love Canal was an abandoned canal near Niagara Falls, New York which was used by the U.S. military and Occidental Petroleum as a chemical waste dumping ground.  Numerous cases of cancer and birth defects were found from the 1950s to the 1970s.  The primary VOC at Love Canal is toluene, which is found along with dioxins and other pollutants.

Valley of the Drums

The Valley of the Drums is a  toxic waste site in northern Bullitt County, Kentucky, near Louisville, named after the waste-containing drums strewn across the area. Contaminants include 
xylene, methyl ethyl ketone, 
methylene chloride,
acetone,
phthalates,
anthracene,
toluene,
fluoranthene,
alkyl benzene,
vinyl chloride,
dichloroethylene, and aliphatic acids.

It is known as one of the primary motivations for the passage of the Comprehensive Environmental Response, Compensation, and Liability Act, or Superfund Act of 1980.

See also
Groundwater pollution
Water quality

References

External links
Agency for Toxic Substances and Disease Registry
Pollution at Camp Lejeune
EPA documents on Love Canal disaster

Water supply
Water pollution